The Little Red Schoolhouse is a 1936 American drama film directed by Charles Lamont and starring Frank Coghlan Jr., Lloyd Hughes and Dickie Moore. A boy runs away from school and heads for New York City.

Cast

References

Bibliography
 Michael R. Pitts. Poverty Row Studios, 1929-1940: An Illustrated History of 55 Independent Film Companies, with a Filmography for Each. McFarland & Company, 2005.

External links
 

1936 films
1936 drama films
American drama films
Films directed by Charles Lamont
Chesterfield Pictures films
American black-and-white films
1930s English-language films
1930s American films